Mohamed Masoud (born ) is an Egyptian male volleyball player. He is part of the Egypt men's national volleyball team. On club level he plays for Smouha SC, then in June 2016 he moved to Al Ahly (volleyball)

References

External links
 profile at FIVB.org

1994 births
Living people
Egyptian men's volleyball players
Place of birth missing (living people)
Volleyball players at the 2016 Summer Olympics
Olympic volleyball players of Egypt
Al Ahly (men's volleyball) players